Miralem Fazlić (born 10 June 1947) is a Bosnian retired professional footballer who played as a defender.

Club career
Fazlić played in his home country for Sloboda Tuzla, and in the NASL between 1975 and 1979 for the Toronto Metros-Croatia and Rochester Lancers. In 1974, he played in the National Soccer League with Toronto Croatia. In 1977, he was named to the Rochester Lancers Team of the Decade.

References

External links
 NASL career stats

1947 births
Living people
Sportspeople from Tuzla
Association football defenders
Yugoslav footballers
Bosnia and Herzegovina footballers
North American Soccer League (1968–1984) players
FK Sloboda Tuzla players
Toronto Croatia players
Toronto Blizzard (1971–1984) players
Rochester Lancers (1967–1980) players
Yugoslav First League players
Yugoslav expatriate footballers
Expatriate soccer players in the United States
Yugoslav expatriate sportspeople in the United States
Expatriate soccer players in Canada
Yugoslav expatriate sportspeople in Canada
Canadian National Soccer League players